Hubert Gundolf (born 17 April 1952) is an Austrian speed skater. He competed in two events at the 1976 Winter Olympics.

References

External links
 

1952 births
Living people
Austrian male speed skaters
Olympic speed skaters of Austria
Speed skaters at the 1976 Winter Olympics
People from Sankt Veit an der Glan
Sportspeople from Carinthia (state)